Mehr Saleh (also Romanized as Mehr Şāleḥ; also known as Mirṣāleḥ) is a village in Fathabad Rural District, in the Central District of Baft County, Kerman Province, Iran. At the 2006 census, its population was 108, in 29 families.

References 

Populated places in Baft County